The 1982 Yale Bulldogs football team represented Yale University in the 1982 NCAA Division I-AA football season.  The Bulldogs were led by 18th-year head coach Carmen Cozza, played their home games at the Yale Bowl and finished tied for fourth place in the Ivy League with a 3–4 record, 4–6 overall.

This was Yale's first year in Division I-AA, after having competed in the top-level Division I-A and its predecessors since helping to found the sport in 1872.

Schedule

References

Yale
Yale Bulldogs football seasons
Yale Bulldogs football